This article is about the list of ADESBA players.  AD Bairro is a Cape Verdean football (soccer) club based in the neighborhood of Craveiro Lopes in Praia, Cape Verde and plays at Estádio da Várzea.  The club was founded in 1975.

One of the most notable players of ADESBA was Zé Piguita who played from 1999 to 2002.

List of players

Notes

References

External links
List of AD Bairro/ADESBA players at the official AD Bairro website 

 
Bairro
Association football player non-biographical articles